The Cortex Plus System is a toolkit RPG system that evolved from Margaret Weis Productions, Ltd's Cortex System.  It has been used for four published games and one published preview to date, and the design principles are in the Cortex Plus Hacker's Guide, a book of advice in how to create new games using Cortex Plus, and list of new games produced via Kickstarter.  According to the Hacker's Guide there are three basic 'flavors' of Cortex Plus; Action, Drama, and Heroic.

Of the four games published using this system, Leverage: The Roleplaying Game was nominated for the 2011 Origins Award for best Role Playing Game, and Marvel Heroic Roleplaying won the 2013 award and the award for best support as well as the 2012 ENnie Award for Best Rules and runner up for Best Game.

System

Unlike the Cortex System, Cortex Plus is a roll and keep system in which you roll one die from each category and keep the two highest dice in your dice pool.  What goes into your dice pool is whatever is considered important for the game you are playing - but different stories have different things they consider important so the implementation of the system has been different for each game so far.  All versions of Cortex Plus use standard polyhedral dice and the normal dice notation ranging from d4 (a 4 sided tetrahedral die) to d12 (a 12-sided dodecahedral die), and narratively notable features are given dice from this list, with d6 being the default.

In all cases Cortex Plus uses dice pools ranging from d4 (terrible) to d12 (the best possible), and every die in your pool that rolls a natural 1 (for players, this is called a "jinx"; the GM rolling a 1 is an "Opportunity" for the players to buy down complications) doesn't count toward your total and causes some form of negative consequence which, depending on the game, either creates a complication for the characters to overcome or adds to the Doom Pool that provides the Game Master resources within the scene.  Adding a d4 to your dice pool is considered a penalty because it isn't likely to roll one of your best two die results and there's such a high chance of rolling a 1.

Most versions of Cortex Plus (other than the Smallville Roleplaying Game) give the character a set of three distinctions that they can choose to add to their dice pool either as a d8 to assist them, or as a d4 to hinder them - but they gain a plot point by using the d4 option.

Equipment is normally handled by enabling the character to do things (you can't shoot someone without a gun) but where it is especially notable it is given a dice rating and added to the dice pool as an asset.  And things that get in the way are treated similarly, and added to the dice pool as complications.

Cortex Plus also uses Plot Points - the normal uses of which are to establish something as notable (turning it into an asset), power a stunt or ability, to add a die to your roll, or to keep an additional die after you have rolled.

Action

Cortex Plus Action is used in both Leverage: The Roleplaying Game and the Firefly Role-Playing Game, and is the most traditional of the three.  The important factors are an attribute (Leverage uses the six from the Cortex System, Firefly uses Physical/Mental/Social), and a Skill (the Leverage RPG uses Grifter, Hacker, Hitter, Mastermind, and Thief which are based on the TV show, while the Firefly RPG has a list of 22).  Also in the dice pool can be a distinction, an asset, and a complication affecting the opposition.

The Leverage RPG, as a heist or con game, allows characters to spend a plot point to establish flashback scenes to explain what is really going on and why things are not as bad as they appear.

Drama

Cortex Plus Drama is used in the Smallville Roleplaying Game, which was the first Cortex Plus game.  It has the most complicated character generation; the players start by drawing a relationship map that step by step ties the player characters to each other and the gameworld.  Instead of attributes and skills, the important factors are considered Relationships with other characters and Values (Duty, Glory, Justice, Love, Power, Truth in Smallville) and each relationship and values having a statement attached and you can use the dice when acting in line with the statement.  A character can also challenge a value statement and possibly reject it, allowing them to use it three times in the dice pool on that roll - but using a smaller die for the rest of the session every time they want to invoke that value or relationship.

When a character loses a contest and doesn't give in Smallville they take stress (Insecure, Afraid, Angry, Exhausted, and Injured) which can be used against them - or they can use at the cost of increasing the amount of stress they've taken, and being unable to act beyond d12 stress.

Heroic

Cortex Plus Heroic was written for Marvel Heroic Roleplaying and has the largest dice pools.  In addition to distinctions, assets, complications, and stress (as used in Drama - with stress being Physical, Mental, and Emotional in Marvel Heroic), Cortex Plus Heroic characters have an Affiliation (Solo, Buddy, Team), at least one powerset and possibly more, and some Specialities (which represent a mix of skills, resources, and contacts).  The powersets are further detailed with SFX and Limits so they more closely represent the vision of the character, and character creation is largely freeform.  Unlike other Cortex Plus games, the default is to keep three dice with the third die representing the effect size and not being added to the total, only the size of this die mattering. This third die is known as the Effect Die.  Marvel Heroic Roleplaying commonly uses large dice pools with seven separate categories (and potentially more than one power set).  The dice in Marvel Heroic are:

From the character:
 Distinction which may be invoked either positively for a d8 or negatively for a d4 (more chance of being a complication, little chance of being one of the best two dice)
 Affiliation (Solo/Budy/Team).  This reflects who the character is with and the nature of the scene.  Each character has one at d6, one at d8, one at d10.
 Power Sets - representing the characters' powers.  To better represent a character's abilities these are tweaked with Sfx and limits.  One die per power set by default - but Sfx can increase this.
 Speciality which represents a mix of character skill, knowledge, and connections in their specialty field. Experts are rated d8, and Masters d10.  A d10 speciality may be replaced by 2d8 or 3d6 and a d8 speciality may be replaced by 2d6.

There are also three potential dice from the situation:
 Asset - a situational advantage or an object that's been created earlier.
 Resource created in a "transition scene" a resource represents a character building something with their skill or calling on their contacts in advance.
 Their opponent's state - opponents may have taken stress (i.e. harm) or complications (i.e. temporary disadvantages) from previous actions, and one die for this may be included.

Extra dice may be included through Plot Points, and characters seldom use all those dice.

Published games using Cortex Plus

 Smallville Roleplaying Game
 Leverage: The Roleplaying Game
 Marvel Heroic Roleplaying
 Dragon Brigade Roleplaying Game
 Firefly Role-Playing Game

Reception
Reception to Cortex Plus games has been good, with Marvel Heroic Roleplaying winning best rules at the 2012 ENnie Awards.  A common theme in reviews is that there are no procedural elements, and you are instead rolling based on what you consider relevant to the situation and the way that 1s add narrative complications to the results that would not normally be expected in other role-playing games.  Another theme picked up on in the system is the way that it allows balance between characters such as Wolverine and Captain America while having enough meat to distinguish them.

References

Margaret Weis Productions games
Role-playing game systems